The Country and Western Sound of Jazz Pianos is an album recorded by jazz pianists Toshiko Akiyoshi and Steve Kuhn in New York City in 1963 and released on the Dauntless label.   It was later re-released on the Chiaroscuro label under the title, Together, Steve Kuhn and Toshiko Akiyoshi.

Track listing
LP Side A
 "Trouble in Mind" (R. Jones) – 4:42
 "Hang Your Head in Shame" (E. G. Nelson, S. Nelson, F. Rose) – 3:54
 "May the Good Lord Bless and Keep You" (M. Willson) – 3:20
 "Someday You'll Want Me to Want You" (J. Hodges) – 4:20
 "Down in the Valley" (traditional) – 3:40
LP Side B
 "Beautiful Brown Eyes" (G. Walters) – 4:22
 "It's No Secret (What God Can Do)" (S. Hamblen) – 4:47
 "Nobody's Darling But Mine" (J. Davis) – 3:23
 "Along the Navajo Trail" (D. Charles, E. DeLange, L. Markes) – 3:24
 "The Foggy Dew" (traditional) – 4:30

Personnel
Arranged & conducted by Ed Summerlin
 Toshiko Akiyoshi – piano, celeste
 Steve Kuhn – piano, harpsichord
 David Izenzon – bass
 John Neves – bass
 Barry Galbraith – guitar
 Pete LaRoca – drums

References

External links
[ Allmusic]
Steve Kuhn at jazzdiscography.com

1963 albums
Toshiko Akiyoshi albums
Steve Kuhn albums
Collaborative albums